Philippe Lacôte is a film director from Côte d'Ivoire. He is most noted for his 2014 film Run, which was a Lumières Award nominee for Best French-Language Film at the 20th Lumières Awards, and his 2020 film Night of the Kings (La Nuit des rois), which was a winner of the Amplify Voices Award at the 2020 Toronto International Film Festival.

Both films were also selected as Côte d'Ivoire's submission to the Academy Awards for the Best International Feature Film Oscar, Run for the 88th Academy Awards in 2016 and Night of the Kings for the 93rd Academy Awards in 2021.

Accolades
In 2021, he was selected as jury member for International competition section of 74th Locarno Film Festival held from 4 to 14 August.

References

External links

Ivorian film directors
Ivorian screenwriters
Ivorian male writers
People from Abidjan
Living people
Year of birth missing (living people)
Male screenwriters
21st-century screenwriters
21st-century male writers